Holy Grail is the third album by Versailles, released on June 15, 2011 it is their first to feature new bassist Masashi. The album includes "Philia", theme song of their TV program Onegai Kanaete Versailles, "Masquerade", main theme of the film Vampire Stories: Brothers and "Vampire", main theme of the film Vampire Stories: Chasers.
 
The limited edition comes with a bonus DVD of the music videos for "Masquerade", "Vampire", "Destiny -The Lovers-" and "Philia". The deluxe box limited edition comes with a DVD of five versions of the "Masquerade" music video, each focusing on a different member, an interview with Kamijo and the making-of the video.

Track listing

References 

Versailles (band) albums
2011 albums